The Samsung Galaxy S10 is a line of Android-based smartphones manufactured, released and marketed by Samsung Electronics as part of the Samsung Galaxy S series. The Galaxy S10 series is the tenth generation of the Samsung Galaxy S, its flagship line of phones next to the Note models, which is also the 10th anniversary of the Galaxy S. Unveiled during the "Samsung Galaxy Unpacked 2019" press event held on 20 February 2019, the devices started shipping in certain regions such as Australia and the United States on 6 March 2019, then worldwide on 8 March 2019.

As has been done since the Galaxy S6, Samsung unveiled flagship Galaxy S10 and Galaxy S10+ models, differentiated primarily by screen size and an additional front-facing camera on the S10+. In addition, Samsung also unveiled a smaller model known as the Galaxy S10e, as well as a larger, 5G-compatible version, the Galaxy S10 5G. In 2020, a midrange variant, the Galaxy S10 Lite, was also introduced.

The Galaxy S10e, S10 and S10+ launch prices started at $749/£669, $899/£799 and $999/£899, while the S10 5G's launch price was $1299/£1099.

On 6 March 2020, Samsung launched the successor to the S10, the Samsung Galaxy S20.

Specifications

Hardware

Display 

The S10 line comprises five models with various hardware specifications; the main S10 and S10+ respectively feature 6.1 and 6.4-inch 1440p "Dynamic AMOLED" displays with HDR10+ support and "dynamic tone mapping" technology. The displays have curved sides that slope over the horizontal edges of the device. Unlike previous Samsung phones, their front-facing cameras occupy a rounded cut-out near the top-right of the display, and both models use an ultrasonic in-screen fingerprint reader. While providing better performance over the optical in-screen fingerprint readers introduced by other recent phones, they are not compatible with all screen protectors. Due to this, the S10 and S10+ are both supplied with a pre-installed plastic screen protector.

Chipsets 
International models of the S10 use the Exynos 9820 system-on-chip, while the U.S. and Chinese models use the Qualcomm Snapdragon 855. The two devices are sold with 128 or 512 GB of internal storage along with 8 GB of RAM, with the S10+ also being sold in a 1-terabyte model with 12 GB of RAM. They respectively contain 3400 mAh with the standard S10 and 4100 mAh batteries for the S10+ model, supporting Qi inductive charging, and the ability to charge other Qi-compatible devices from their own battery power.

Cameras 
The S10 features a 3-lens rear-facing camera setup; it retains the dual-aperture 12-megapixel and 12-megapixel telephoto lenses of the Galaxy S9+, but now uses a camera module introduced on the Note 9 and also adds a 16-megapixel ultra-wide angle lens. The front-facing camera on the S10+ is accompanied by a second RGB depth sensor, which Samsung states helps improve the quality of photo effects and augmented reality image filters. Both sets of cameras support 4K video recording and HDR10+. The camera software includes a new "Shot Suggestion" feature to assist users, "Artistic Live Filters", as well as the ability to post directly to Instagram posts and stories. S10+ uses a double hole punch design for the front camera, while S10 uses a single hole punch design. The Galaxy S10e and S10 make use of "advanced heat-pipe" cooling systems, but the more expensive Galaxy S10 Plus uses a vapor chamber cooling system.

In the manual mode, the exposure time can be increased up to ten seconds.

Models 
Alongside the main S10 and S10+, Samsung also unveiled two additional models. The S10e is a compact version of the S10, featuring a smaller, flat, 5.8-inch 1080p display with no curved edges. Its fingerprint reader is contained within the power button on the right side rather than in-display, and it excludes the 12-megapixel telephoto camera of the S10. It still includes the dual-aperture 12-megapixel and 16-megapixel ultra-wide-angle sensors. It has a smaller battery.

There is also a larger, phablet-sized premium model known as the S10 5G, which features support for 5G wireless networks, a 6.7-inch display, 256 or 512 GB of non-expandable storage, additional 3D time-of-flight cameras on both the front and rear, and a non-user-replaceable 4,500 mAh battery. This model was temporarily exclusive to Verizon Wireless on launch in 2019 before expanding to other carriers in the weeks after launch.

Charging speeds are 45 Watts on the S10 Lite, 25 Watts on the S10 5G and 15 Watts on the S10e, the first two of which mark the first increase since the 2014 Galaxy Note 4 and 2015 Galaxy S6.

The S10 series (except S10 Lite) is the last model in the Galaxy S series to feature 3.5 mm headphone jack, as its successors, the S20, S20+, and S20 Ultra, do not.

In January 2020, the S10 Lite was released. It is a midrange variant of the S10, containing the same cameras as the main variant. It features 128 GB of expandable storage, a 6.7 inch 1080p screen on a aluminum frame, and a 4,500 mAh battery. This variant removes the 3.5 mm headphone jack featured on all of the 2019 variants of the S10, as well as wireless charging, instead being equipped with 25 watt Super Fast Charging picked up from the Galaxy Note 10. Unlike the main variants, the S10 Lite is only offered with Snapdragon 855 chipset.

Colors 
Galaxy S10e, S10, and S10+ are available in the colors Prism White, Prism Black, Prism Green, Prism Blue, Prism Silver, Cardinal Red, Flamingo Pink, and Smoke Blue. Galaxy S10e is also available in Canary Yellow. Galaxy S10 5G comes in the colors Crown Silver, Majestic Black, and Royal Gold. Galaxy S10+ and Galaxy S10+ Performance Edition offer two additional color choices: Ceramic Black and White. The Performance Edition ceramic models offer 12 GB RAM and 1 TB of internal storage.

Software 
The S10 range ships with Android 9.0 "Pie". They are the first Samsung smartphones to ship with a major revamp of Samsung's Android user experience known as One UI. A main design element of One UI is intentional repositioning of key user interface elements in stock apps to improve usability on large screens. Many apps include large headers that push the beginning of content towards the center of the display, while navigation controls and other prompts are often displayed near the bottom of the display instead.

Samsung released the Android 10 update to the Galaxy S10 series on 28 November 2019. The update includes One UI version 2.0.

On 18 August 2020, it was announced by Samsung that all variants of the S10 series would be supported for three generations of Android software updates.

An official list released by Samsung on 2 December 2020, further confirmed that all S10 models would be receiving the Android 11 upgrade with One UI 3.

The Galaxy S10 series received the Android 12 upgrade with One UI 4, which marked the last operating system upgrade for the series. It will have a last year of security updates.

Known issues 
The fingerprint scanner had a security flaw that allowed anyone to unlock the phone with a silicone screen protector, which also affected the Note 10. Samsung rolled out a patch to fix this problem on 23 October 2019.

Reception 
Dan Seifert from The Verge gave the S10 a score of 8.5/10, praising its excellent display, performance, battery life, versatile camera system and headphone jack inclusion. However, he noted that the new in-screen fingerprint scanner was slower and more finicky and camera performance was not as good as the Pixel 3's in low light.

Andrei Frumusanu from AnandTech reported that the Exynos 9820 performed significantly better than the previous year's Exynos 9810, although he also stated that the Exynos 9820 still couldn't keep up with the Snapdragon 855. The Exynos 9820 was stated to be a lot less efficient than the Snapdragon but despite that in the Web Browsing test it actually outdid the Snapdragon by 0.33 hours; the Exynos however suffered in the PCMark battery life test scoring a 0.55 hour deficit compared to the Snapdragon equipped model.

Marques Brownlee praised the S10's One UI for improving one-handed usability. He labelled the S10+ as one of the few $1000 smartphones that are worth their price tag.

Jeffrey Van Camp from Wired rated the S10 9/10 for its all-screen design, fun features, ultrasonic fingerprint sensor, wireless charging with power sharing and headphone jack inclusion. His complaints were that the camera, while fantastic, still couldn't rival the Pixel 3's night shots, it could be difficult to find what the user wanted in the settings menus, wireless power sharing was slow and the edges needed palm rejection.

The S10+ received an overall score of 109 from DXOMARK; it had a photo score of 114, a video score of 97, and a selfie score of 96. The S10 5G received an overall score of 112, tying it as the site's top ranked phone at the time along with the P30 Pro. It had a photo score of 117, a video score of 100, and a selfie score of 97.

Sales of the S10 have exceeded that of the preceding S9, with the S10+ being the most popular model followed by the regular S10 and then the S10e.

Gallery

See also 
 Samsung Galaxy
 Samsung Galaxy S series
 Comparison of Samsung Galaxy S smartphones

References

External links 
 
 Samsung S10 Lite Official website

Android (operating system) devices
Discontinued flagship smartphones
Samsung smartphones
Mobile phones introduced in 2019
Samsung Galaxy
Mobile phones with multiple rear cameras
Mobile phones with 4K video recording